CMH Records is a Los Angeles-based, independent country and bluegrass label with several subsidiary labels, including Vitamin Records, Crosscheck, Dwell, and Rockabye Baby!. The label release diverse styles of music including string quartet tributes, punk, metal, and lullabies.

History
CMH co-founder Martin Haerle grew up in Stuttgart, Germany during World War II, where he heard American country music on Armed Forces Radio. At the age of 20 he moved to Nashville to work in the mailroom at Starday Records, where he learned the record business from legendary label president and A&R man Don Pierce. Haerle was promoted to vice president by the early 1960s, and later worked in country radio. In 1968, he became general manager of United Artists Records' manufacturing division.

In 1975, Haerle formed CMH in Los Angeles with Arthur Smith, the renowned guitarist who wrote both the million-selling "Guitar Boogie" and "Dueling Banjos," the bluegrass standard made famous by the movie Deliverance. By the mid 1970s, major country labels including RCA and MCA had dropped all of their bluegrass acts, with the notable exception of Bill Monroe. CMH was one of a small number of independent labels that cropped up to fill the void.

Haerle and Smith signed many major first-generation bluegrass artists, some contemporary bluegrass groups, and several important country artists. Writes Jonny Whiteside in LA Weekly, "They churned a slow but steady series of albums by out-of-fashion geniuses, like Merle Travis, Joe and Rose Lee Maphis and Grandpa Jones, carving out a corner of the market for marginalized and ignored country stars (much the way his mentor Pierce did at Starday Records in the 1960s)."

Between 1975 and 1988, CMH released albums by Lester Flatt & The Nashville Grass, The Osborne Brothers, Jim & Jesse, Mac Wiseman, Carl Story, The Stonemans, Josh Graves, Don Reno, Benny Martin, The Bluegrass Cardinals, IInd Generation featuring Eddie Adcock, Grandpa Jones, Merle Travis, Joe Maphis, Johnny Gimble, Carl & Pearl Butler, and the only studio album by legendary songwriters Felice and Boudleaux Bryant.

When Martin Haerle died in 1990, his son David Haerle stepped in to run the label, and created the Pickin' On series, which consists of bluegrass tributes to rock, pop and country artists including Jimmy Buffett, Kenny Chesney, Led Zeppelin, and The Offspring. The first title in the series was Pickin' on The Beatles (1994), but it wasn't until three years later that the concept took off with the success of Pickin' on The Grateful Dead.

Labels under the CMH umbrella include Vitamin Records, Rockabye Baby!, Dwell, Crosscheck, Scufflin', PanAm, Urabon, Rockwell, OCD International, School of Rock, and Open Mike.

Partial discography
 Lost Songs: Songs the Beatles Gave Away (2007)
 Strummin' With The Devil: The Southern Side of Van Halen - A Tribute Featuring David Lee Roth (2006)
 The Nashville Acoustic Sessions, Raul Malo, Pat Flynn, Rob Ickes, Dave Pomeroy (2004)
 Heart Trouble,  Wanda Jackson (2003)
 Fade to Bluegrass: The Bluegrass Tribute to Metallica (2003)
 Corporate Love Breakdown: The Bluegrass Tribute to Radiohead

Roster
CMH Records

 Eddie Adcock
 Badlands
 Bass Mountain Boys
 Bluegrass Cardinals
 Johnny Bond
 Felice and Boudleaux Bryant
 Cache Valley Drifters
 Carl Butler and Pearl
 Carolina Road
 Larry Cordle
 Carter Falco
 Lester Flatt
 Jimmy Gaudreau
 Johnny Gimble
 Josh Graves
 Heights of Grass
 Wanda Jackson
 Jim & Jesse
 Grandpa Jones
 Lonesome Standard Time
 Manuela
 Joe Maphis
 Benny Martin
 Jimmy Martin
 The Masters (Jesse McReynolds, Josh Graves, Kenny Baker, Eddie Adcock)
 Mose McCormack
 Nashville Grass
 Osborne Brothers
 Wynn Osborne
 David Parmley & Continental Divide
 Pine Mountain Railroad
 Pinnacle Boys
 Don Reno
 David Lee Roth
 Colonel Jim Silvers
 Arthur "Guitar Boogie" Smith
 Buddy Spicher
 The Stonemans
 Carl Story
 Marty Stuart
 Merle Travis
 The Willis Brothers
 Mac Wiseman

OCD International 
 Kool Keith (Dr. Octagon)

Dwell Records
 Antagonist
 Behemoth
 The Chasm
 Coffin Texts
 Evoken
 Exhausted Prayer
 Fight Pretty
 Hail! Hornet
 Inner Thought
 It Is I
 Mayhem
 Opera IX
 Soilent Green
 Stormcrow

Crosscheck Records
 Electric Frankenstein
 Hammer Bros.
 Street Dogs
 U.S. Bombs
 Vice Dolls

Scufflin' Records
 Lonnie Smith
 Reuben Wilson
 Bernie Worrell

Secret Life of Records
 Violent Femmes

See also
 Rockabye Baby!
 Vitamin Records
 Vitamin String Quartet

References

External links
 Official site

American record labels
Bluegrass record labels
Record labels established in 1975